Ravenous, Murderous is the second album by the band Murder Squad. It was released by Treeman Recordings in 2003.

Track listing

Credits
 Matti Kärki - Vocals
 Richard Cabeza - Bass
 Uffe Cederlund - Guitars
 Peter Stjärnvind - Drums
 Chris Reifert - Guest Vocals, Additional Guitars, Drums
 T. Ketola - Cover Art

2003 albums
Murder Squad albums